Susanne Schwendtner is an Austrian para table tennis player.

She represented Austria at the 1996 Summer Paralympics in Atlanta, United States and she won two medals: the gold medal in the Women's Singles 5 event and one of the bronze medals in the Women's Open 1–5 event.

References

External links 
 

Living people
Year of birth missing (living people)
Place of birth missing (living people)
Table tennis players at the 1996 Summer Paralympics
Medalists at the 1996 Summer Paralympics
Paralympic gold medalists for Austria
Paralympic bronze medalists for Austria
Paralympic table tennis players of Austria
Paralympic medalists in table tennis
Austrian female table tennis players
20th-century Austrian women